Idalus daga is a moth of the family Erebidae. It was described by Paul Dognin in 1891. It is found in French Guiana, Venezuela, Ecuador, Peru, Brazil and Bolivia.

References

 

daga
Moths described in 1891